Axel Kassegger (born 4 January 1966) is an Austrian politician who has been a Member of the National Council for the Freedom Party of Austria (FPÖ) since 2013.

Kassegger was listed as a recipient of thousands of euros as compensation for his presence at the 2016 Yalta Economic Forum in Russia's occupied Crimea in OCCRP investigation of Russia's International Agency for Current Policy.

References

1966 births
Living people
Members of the National Council (Austria)
Freedom Party of Austria politicians
University of Graz alumni